Serapias stenopetala is an orchid plant that is in the genus Serapias. The common name of the plant is sérapias à pétales étroits in French. The plant is endemic to Algeria, and Tunisia.

References

External links
 Serapias stenopetala on Missouri Botanical Garden

stenopetalas
Taxa named by René Maire